Mithun Chakraborty (born Gouranga Chakraborty; 16 June 1950) is an Indian actor, producer and politician who predominantly worked in Hindi and Bengali language films. He is a former Rajya Sabha Member of Parliament. He is the recipient of three National Film Awards and three Filmfare Awards for his acting performance.

Chakraborty made his acting debut with the art house drama Mrigayaa (1976), for which he won his first National Film Award for Best Actor. Chakraborty played Jimmy in the 1982 film Disco Dancer, which was commercially successful in India and the Soviet Union, the first film in India to gross Rs.100 crore. Besides Disco Dancer, Chakraborty is also remembered for his performance in films such as Surakksha, Sahhas, Wardat, Wanted, Boxer, Pyar Jhukta Nahin, Pyari Behna, Avinash, Dance Dance, Prem Pratigyaa, Mujrim, Agneepath, Yugandhar, The Don, and Jallaad. In 1991, he won the Filmfare Award for Best Supporting Actor for his role as Krishnan Iyer Nariyal Paniwala in the film Agneepath.

He later won two more National Film Awards for his performances in Tahader Katha (1992) and Swami Vivekananda (1998). Chakraborty has appeared in more than 350 films, including Bengali, Hindi, Odia, Bhojpuri, Tamil, Telugu, Kannada, and Punjabi pictures. He is the record holder in the Limca Book of Records for 19 movie releases as lead actor in the year 1989 and the record is still unbroken in Bollywood as of July 2022.

Chakraborty owns the Monarch Group, which has interests in the hospitality and educational sectors. He has also started the production house Paparatzy Productions. In 1992, he, along with Dilip Kumar and Sunil Dutt, set up a trust to help needy actors called Cine & T.V Artistes Association (CINTAA). He was also the Chairperson of Film Studios Setting & Allied Mazdoor Union, which takes care of the welfare of cine workers and resolves their demands and problems. The television show Dance India Dance where Chakraborty is the Grand Master has already been entered in the Limca Book of Records and the Guinness World Records. Chakraborty played a crucial role of mediator between Pranab Mukherjee of the Indian National Congress and Mamata Banerjee, winning the Mukherjee the support of Banerjee's party, the All India Trinamool Congress, in the 2012 Indian presidential election. He joined the Bharatiya Janata Party (BJP) on 7 March 2021, ahead of the 2021 West Bengal Legislative Assembly election.

Early life and education
Chakraborty was born on 16 June 1950 into a Bengali Hindu family in Calcutta (now Kolkata), West Bengal, India to Basanta Kumar Chakraborty and Shanti Rani Chakraborty. He studied at Oriental Seminary and then earned his B.Sc. degree in Chemistry from Scottish Church College in Kolkata. After that, he attended and graduated from the Film and Television Institute of India, Pune. He was a Naxalite before entering films, but tragedy struck his family when his only brother was electrocuted and killed in a freak accident. He returned to his family and left the Naxalite fold, even though this posed a grave risk to his own life. During his days as a Naxalite, he became friends with Ravi Ranjan, a popular Naxal figure, known to his friends as "Bhaa" (the ultimate saviour). Bhaa was known for his manipulational skills and oratory abilities.

Film career

Debut and stardom (1976–1990)
Chakraborty made his Bollywood debut with Mrinal Sen's National Award winning film Mrigayaa (1976), for which he won the National Film Award for Best Actor. After playing a few minor roles in films such as Do Anjaane (1976) and Phool Khile Hain Gulshan Gulshan (1978), his first major successful film was the 1978 film Mera Rakshak. During those days Chakraborty was supported by his Nadi Theke Sagare co-star Debashree Roy. He rose to stardom with the low budget spy film Surakshaa (1979), directed by Ravikant Nagaich. The film was so successful that many movies starring Chakraborty in the lead were launched. His combination with Deepak Bahry also happened for the first time in 1979 with Tarana and they would go on to collaborate on many hit films together in the 1980s such as Humse Badhkar Kaun, Hum Se Hai Zamana and Woh Jo Hasina. Another important film for Chakraborty in the late 1970s was Prem Vivah, directed by Basu Chatterjee.

Chakraborty made an impact on Hindi cinema in the 1980s with the "brand of impossible heroics and made-for-the-front-row lines." He starred in over 110 releases in this decade in several films of various genres such as action, family drama, romance and comedy. Chakraborty played Bheema in the super-hit multi-starrer Hum Paanch (1980). He played dual roles for the first time in Taxi Chor (1980) and later played dual roles in 19 films.

In 1982, he shot to superstardom with his most recognisable leading role in the musical Disco Dancer, which extended Chakraborty's popularity across India and into Russia and established him as a dancing star. The film's director Babbar Subhash teamed up with Chakraborty again with the cult musical films Kasam Paida Karne Wale Ki (1984), Dance Dance (1987) and Commando  (1988) which were also successful. His 1985 superhit movie Pyar Jhukta Nahin reconfirmed his top star status. That same year, he was also appreciated for his role as Javar in the JP Dutta film, Ghulami. Chakraborty also became India's highest tax payer in 1986. Chakraborty's most successful family dramas included Mujhe Insaaf Chahiye (1983), Ghar Ek Mandir (1984), Swarag Se Sunder (1986) and Pyaar Ka Mandir (1988). His comedies included Shaukeen (1982) Pasand Apni Apni (1983) and Baat Ban Jaye (1986) and action films such as Jagir (1984), Jaal (1986), Dilwala (1986), Muddat (1986), Watan Ke Rakhwale (1987), Jeete Hain Shaan Se (1988), Waqt Ki Awaz (1988), Ilaaka (1989), Daata (1989) and Guru (1989). These films remain his most commercially successful films to date. His performances never won any award in 1986 and 1987 as the Filmfare Awards were never announced due to technical reasons. As Chakraborty always had a high number of releases, sometimes it affected the business of his own films, as happened in 1989, where he had a record 19 films, including super hits like Ilaaka, Mujrim, Prem Pratigya and Daata, and hits like Ladaai, Guru and Bees Saal Baad.

He made his debut in Bengali cinema with Arabinda Mukhopadhyay's Nadi Theke Sagare (1978) which was a major success at box office. In the 1980s he shot three blockbusters — Kalankini Kankabati (1981) directed by Uttam Kumar, Troyee (1982) by Goutam Mukherjee and Anyay Abichar (1985) by Shakti Samanta.

Comeback to Bengali cinema (1990–1999)

Chakraborty had another 100 plus releases in this decade too, starting with Agneepath, which won him the Filmfare Award for Best Supporting Actor. Films such as Shandaar, Gunahon Ka Devta, Pyar Ka Devta, Trinetra and Mere Sajana Saath Nibhana followed. In 1992, the critically acclaimed Bengali film Tahader Katha won him his second National Film Award for Best Actor. In this period he decided to take a break from Mumbai. He shifted his entire family to Ooty and he constructed The Monarch Hotel. Chakraborty then decided to do movies only to be shot at Ooty and nearby locations and he provided discount rates to the film crew to stay in his hotel as well. This strategy paid off as numerous films starring Chakraborty were launched every week, so he shifted his focus from mainstream Hindi cinemas to low-budget movies. Dalaal was released followed by other low-budget films such as Phool Aur Angaar, Ravan Raaj: A True Story and Shapath, which created a market for low-budget productions.

Jallad won him the Filmfare Best Villain Award and Star Screen Award Best Villain for the year 1995. His economical film production was popular as Mithun's Dream Factory. Even he could not do Mani Ratnam's Tamil film Iruvar as his character had to crop his hair, which would have affected his other 15 films at that time.  By this time, Chakraborty held the record for appearing in the most Hindi films as a hero. A third National Award followed in 1998, this time as the Best Supporting Actor, for his portrayal of Ramakrishna Paramahamsa in G. V. Iyer's Swami Vivekananda. Once again, the overdose of Chakraborty releases affected the business as 1998 and 1999 itself had almost 30 releases. Meantime, he paid more taxes than anyone else in the country in the mean period for 5 continuous years, from 1995 to 1999. This decade proved Chakraborty as a businessman more than a star as low-budget filmmakers were given their due by Mithun. He operates hotels in Masinagudi and Ooty in Tamil Nadu, Mysore, Siliguri and Kolkata.  After his Bollywood career took a back seat, he concentrated more on Bengali films. He also appeared in Goutam Ghose's Gudia in 1999 as well as Rituparno Ghosh's Titli in 2002.

Comeback to Hindi cinema and debut in other cinemas (2000–2019)

Mithun's Dream Factory films still continued to hold the audiences. He featured in Prasanta Bal's period drama Hindustani Sipahi (2002), based on veteran actor and dramatist Utpal Dutt's Bengali play Ferari Fauj. Chakraborty also made a comeback to the mainstream Hindi film industry in 2005 with the film Elaan. After a few supporting roles in films such as Lucky: No Time for Love (2005) and Dil Diya Hai (2006), he starred in Mani Ratnam's film Guru. He was also acclaimed for his villainous role in Kalpana Lajmi's Chingaari (2005). His 2009 movie Zor Lagaa Ke...Haiya! won multiple International awards and Chal Chalein was appreciated by critics for its bold theme. The critically acclaimed Phir Kabhi with Dimple Kapadia had a première through a direct to home (DTH) release in September 2009 and won as many as six awards in as many categories at the Los Angeles Reel Awards of 2009.

In 2006 he starred in the movie MLA Fatakeshto and its sequel Minister Fatakeshto in 2007 both of which were blockbusters. In 2008, he collaborated again with Buddhadeb Dasgupta for Kaalpurush and later appeared in films Shukno Lanka and Target: The Final Mission. His performances in Mrigaya, Tahader Katha, Kaalpurush and Titli won him National Film Awards and nominations. His debut Bhojpuri film Bhole Shankar is considered the biggest Bhojpuri film. Similarly, his Odia film Ae Jugara Krushna Sudama in which he co-starred with Odia icon Uttam Mohanty was also a huge success. The last Bengali hits for Chakraborty were Handa and Bhonda, Nobel Chor and Le Halwa Le.

Chakraborty's other films include Veer, (2010) with Salman Khan and Golmaal 3 (2010), with Ajay Devgn and in 2012, he did 3 films with Akshay Kumar, Housefull 2, OMG – Oh My God! and Khiladi 786. His home production Enemmy (2013) was with his son Mimoh Chakraborty and actor Sunil Shetty and he also did Anthony D'Souza's Boss (2013) with Akshay Kumar. Later in Subhash Ghai's Kaanchi... (2014), he played an evil politician wearing facial prosthetics that won him critical acclaim. Kick with Salman Khan earned more than  375 crore worldwide. Chakraborty also had Entertainment, Hawaizaada and Anil Sharma's Genius as other releases and in 2019, The Tashkent Files directed by Vivek Agnihotri became a sleeper hit.

Chakraborty's Telugu film Gopala Gopala with Daggubati Venkatesh, Shriya Saran, Pawan Kalyan, Bengali film Herogiri along with actor Dev and Yagavarayinum Naa Kaakka, the Tamil film and its Telugu version Malupu were released successfully along with Debaditya Bandopadhyay's Bengali film Naxal, while his long delayed film Ek Nadir Galpo: Tale of a River has been officially released and became a success at the box office.

Chakraborty's Bengali film, the science fiction Jole Jongole was released in February 2017 and the long delayed Hason Raja has been resumed with Chakraborty paired opposite Raima Sen. He has also made his Kannada debut with The Villain starring Shiva Rajkumar and Sudeep .

2020–present
The delayed horror film 12 'O' Clock directed by Ram Gopal Varma was released in January 2021. Chakaraborty's first web series Bestseller for OTT platform Amazon Prime released on 18 February 2022.

His latest film The Kashmir Files was released worldwide on 11 March 2022 and has been blockbuster at the box office.It was also an official entry of an Indian Movie to the Oscar.

Television career

After the success of the Bengali competitive dance reality show Dance Bangla Dance, Chakraborty developed the concept of Dance India Dance, an Indian dance competition show that airs on Zee TV in India, produced by UTV Software Communications and has become India's largest dance-based reality show. The contestants get a chance to perform before a panel of judges composed of Terrence Lewis, Remo D'Souza and Geeta Kapoor. The selection of the season's Top 18 live show finalists are overseen by head judge Chakraborty. The show has won several television awards for most popular dance reality show. Chakraborty was also the Grand Master of Dance India Dance Li'l Masters as well as the host of the reality show Dadagiri Unlimited on Zee Bangla channel. He replaced Sourav Ganguly as the host of the show. Chakraborty hosted the Bengali version of Bigg Boss and Rannaghore Rockstar on ETV Bangla. Chakraborty made his acting debut on TV with the comedy show The Drama Company.

Chakraborty appeared as co-judge in the Star Jalsha's Dance Dance Junior, also judged by Tollywood actors, Soham and Srabanti Chatterjee.

He appeared as a co-judge with Karan Johar and Parineeti Chopra on the reality show titled Hunarbaaz: Desh Ki Shaan, which is premiere on Colors TV from January 2022.
In the year 2023 he returned to sets of Dance Bangla Dance on Zee Bangla as Mahaguru.

Political career

Chakraborty joined as a Member of Parliament after he was nominated for the Rajya Sabha Member of Parliament elections by the Chief Minister of West Bengal Mamata Banerjee for her All India Trinamool Congress (TMC) in the West Bengal Rajya Sabha Assembly Polls which were held on 7 February 2014. On 26 December 2016, he resigned as a Rajya Sabha MP. Chakraborty joined the Bharatiya Janata Party (BJP) on 7 March 2021, ahead of the 2021 West Bengal Legislative Assembly election, in the presence of Prime Minister Narendra Modi and Kailash Vijayvargiya.

Brand ambassador
Chakraborty was the ambassador of Panasonic electronics for India back in the late 1980s. Now he is the face of GoDaddy, an internet domain registrar and web-hosting company. He was also the face of Channel 10, a unit of Bengal Media Pvt. Ltd. owned by Saradha Media Group, and he later said "Saradha didn't pay my dues" as its branch Saradha Chit Fund collapsed. Chakraborty is also the face of Manappuram Gold Loan for West Bengal state.

Personal life
He first married actress Helena Luke in 1979, but after 4 months of marriage the couple separated and filed for a divorce. He then married actress Yogeeta Bali in 1979.
Chakraborty and Yogeeta have four children- Mimoh, Ushmey Chakraborty, Namashi Chakraborty and an adopted daughter Dishani Chakraborty. In the 1980s, he was romantically linked to the actress Sridevi, whom he met on the sets of Jaag Utha Insan, and it was rumored that the two were married. However, when Chakraborty refused to leave his wife, Yogeeta Bali, Sridevi ended the romance and Chakraborty remained with his wife.

Filmography

Awards and honours

In popular culture
 The title character of the comic book Jimmy Zhingchak is a parody of Mithun Chakraborty.
 The 2010 film Golmaal 3 also parodies Chakraborty's film career as a dancing star. The film even has the songs "Disco Dancer" and "Yaad Aa Raha Hai" which were in the film Disco Dancer.
 In the 2011 film Delhi Belly, Aamir Khan parodies Chakraborty in the song "I Hate You (Like I Love You)" dressed as "Disco Fighter".
 In 2010, Guinea-Bissau issued postal stamp in Mithun Chakraborty's honour.

Books on Mithun Chakraborty

References

External links

 
 
 

1950 births
Best Actor National Film Award winners
Film and Television Institute of India alumni
Indian male film actors
Male actors from West Bengal
Male actors from Hyderabad, India
Male actors from Mumbai
Brahmos
Living people
Male actors in Hindi cinema
Oriental Seminary alumni
Scottish Church College alumni
University of Calcutta alumni
Rajya Sabha members from West Bengal
Male actors in Bengali cinema
Bengali male actors
Best Supporting Actor National Film Award winners
Screen Awards winners
Filmfare Awards winners
Indian television presenters
Bharatiya Janata Party politicians from West Bengal
Former members of Trinamool Congress